is a Japanese composer and sound designer, best known for his work on the soundtracks for killer7, God Hand, No More Heroes, and the Earth Defense Force and Danganronpa series. Takada often collaborates with guitarist and composer Jun Fukuda, and has worked on multiple projects for Goichi Suda's studio Grasshopper Manufacture.

Career
Takada was born in Inuyama, Aichi, Japan, and took interest in music since childhood after playing the Electone at Yamaha Music School and experimenting with synthesizers. He learned to play the piano and tuba in high school and studied music in Tokyo for six years, earning a degree. He entered the game industry around the end of the Super Famicom, which he felt was a good time as game console sound chips were becoming more advanced. In 1997, Takada composed the soundtrack of Moonlight Syndrome, directed by Goichi Suda. Takada would compose music for multiple projects by Grasshopper Manufacture, which Suda founded after leaving Human Entertainment. For killer7, Takada placed a large emphasis on ambient music and sought to retell the game's story through the music. He considers the game's soundtrack to be among his favorite work. For No More Heroes, Takada took inspiration from The Chemical Brothers for the boss music. 

On November 5, 2008, Takada founded Sound Prestige, a music and sound production company. The company also functions as a record label where Takada publishes his own music. Takada composed the soundtrack of Danganronpa: Trigger Happy Havoc which released in 2010. For the soundtrack, Takada combined a variety of tones to convey tension and claustrophobia during exploration, and a sense of momentum during trials. Takada returned to compose the soundtrack of the sequel, Danganronpa 2: Goodbye Despair, in 2012, which sought to convey a tropical feel due to the change in setting. Takada composed for Danganronpa V3: Killing Harmony in 2017, aiming for a more mature composition which ended up being more jazz-oriented. The soundtrack for V3 was much larger than the previous titles, and was split into two album releases.

In 2017, Takada co-founded the video game development studio Too Kyo Games, alongside former members of Spike Chunsoft. Takada composed for Death Come True and was sound supervisor for World's End Club, both releasing in 2020. Takada will be composing for Master Detective Archives: Rain Code with Jun Fukuda, which was announced in November 2021.

Works
All works listed below were composed by Takada unless otherwise noted.

References

External links
  
  

1970 births
Anime composers
Japanese male composers
Living people
Musicians from Aichi Prefecture
People from Inuyama, Aichi
Japanese sound designers
Video game composers